The Ponys were an American indie rock/garage rock band from Chicago, Illinois, United States, formed by singer/guitarist Jered Gummere, in early 2001. Gummere was concurrently in the punk band, Guilty Pleasures, at the time of The Ponys’ formation. He eventually left to devote himself entirely to The Ponys. Gummere recruited members of the band, his first choice being girlfriend Melissa Elias whom he met while she was attending Illinois State University in his hometown. Together they experimented with indie/post-punk styles.

The two began to write songs, and were joined by ex-Mushuganas drummer, Nathan Jerde. The Ponys began touring the Chicago club circuit and would then record their first singles on Contaminated and Big Neck records. Concerned their sound was lacking, Gummere asked Ian Adams, a member of Happy Supply to join the band.
After releasing a few more singles, the Ponys signed with In the Red Records (based in Los Angeles), due to widespread circulation. The band was set to record their first album, Laced with Romance, in Detroit with producer Jim Diamond.

Laced with Romance 
Their initial release, Laced With Romance, met with moderate critical success  . The album reached media from local indie-zines such as Horizontal Action, to mainstream-America music publications like Rolling Stone and Spin.

The Ponys toured to support their album, with bands like The Unicorns, The Fall, and The Fiery Furnaces.

Celebration Castle 
Despite some members wanting to leave due mostly to exhaustion, The Ponys continued and began to record their second album.  Wanting to record locally they met with Chicago-based producer Steve Albini, who had previously worked with artists such as PJ Harvey, The Pixies, and Nirvana.
The Ponys began recording in late 2004 and were finished in four days. The album held a much cleaner tone than the first, but still retained the recognizable live sound that they were known for. Later that year, Ian Adams left the band, tired of touring and was replaced by Brian Case of 90 Day Men. Celebration Castle was released in early 2005 and the band continued touring.

Turn the Lights Out 
Since recording Celebration Castle, the Ponys have left In the Red Records and signed with the New York-based indie label Matador Records. They recorded their third album, titled Turn The Lights Out, in the fall of 2006. The album was released on March 20, 2007. In 2010, the band released their first new recording since Turn the Lights Out, the EP Deathbed Plus 4.

Guitarist Brian Case currently plays in Disappears.

Discography

Studio albums
 Laced with Romance (In the Red, 2004)
 Celebration Castle (In the Red, 2005)
 Turn the Lights Out (Matador, 2007)

Other
 Wicked City (Big Neck, 2002)
 Pop Culture (Maybe Chicago?/Criminal IQ, 2004)
 Another Wound (Sweet Nothing, 2005)
 Deathbed +4 (Matador, 2010)

TV appearances
Beautiful Noise
Entourage, Season 4, Episode: Dream Team

Band members

Current
Jered Gummere – guitar, vocals
Melissa Elias – bass, vocals
Brian Case – guitar
Nathan Jerde – percussion

Past
Ian Adams – guitar

References

External links
The Ponys on Myspace

Garage rock groups from Illinois
Indie rock musical groups from Illinois
Garage punk groups
Musical groups from Chicago
2001 establishments in Illinois
Musical groups established in 2001
2010s disestablishments in Illinois
Musical groups disestablished in the 2010s
Matador Records artists